Real and Chance: The Legend Hunters is an American reality television.  The show premiered on VH1 on September 19, 2010, and consists of ten 60-minute episodes that aired through November 24, 2010.

Overview
The program follows brothers Ahmad Givens, aka. Real, and Kamal Givens, aka. Chance, from VH1's Real Chance of Love, as they hunt for mythical creatures such as The Mega Shark, Bigfoot, and Hogzilla.

Episodes

Reception
Common Sense Media gave the show three out of five stars, commenting that although some of the material in the show would be inappropriate for very young viewers, the show's hosts are "respectful toward the people they're learning from, but they still manage to hold on to their trademark bawdy sense of humor". A reviewer for Huffpost TV stated that the show's premise was "dopey" but that the show's concept was "inherently entertaining".

References

External links
 Real and Chance: The Legend Hunters at VH1.com
 

2010 American television series debuts
2010s American reality television series
2010 American television series endings
Television series by 51 Minds Entertainment
English-language television shows
VH1 original programming